Sıraköy is a village in Tarsus district of Mersin Province, Turkey. At  it is situated in the southern slopes of Toros Mountains. Turkish state highway  is to the east of, and the Berdan dam reservoir is to the south of the village. The population of the village was 428  as of 2012. The major crop of the village is grape.

References

Villages in Tarsus District